Siler is a genus of Asian jumping spiders that was first described by Eugène Louis Simon in 1889. They specialize in hunting ants.

Species
 it contains nine species, found only in Asia:
Siler bielawskii Zabka, 1985 – China, Vietnam
Siler collingwoodi (O. Pickard-Cambridge, 1871) – China, Japan
Siler cupreus Simon, 1889 (type) – China, Korea, Taiwan, Japan
Siler flavocinctus (Simon, 1901) – Singapore
Siler hanoicus Prószyński, 1985 – Vietnam
Siler lewaense Prószyński & Deeleman-Reinhold, 2010 – Indonesia (Sumba)
Siler pulcher Simon, 1901 – Malaysia
Siler semiglaucus (Simon, 1901) – India to Philippines
Siler severus (Simon, 1901) – China

References

External links
 Photograph of S. semiglaucus (?)

Salticidae
Salticidae genera
Spiders of Asia